The 2017 East Carolina Pirates football team represented East Carolina University in the 2017 NCAA Division I FBS football season. They were led by second-year head coach Scottie Montgomery and played their home games at Dowdy–Ficklen Stadium. The Pirates competed as members of the East Division of the American Athletic Conference. They finished the season 3–9, 2–6 in AAC play to finish in a three-way tie for fourth place in the East Division.

Schedule
ECU announced their 2017 football schedule on February 9, 2017. They will host seven home games for the first time in school history.

East Carolina's schedule was reorganized by the American Athletic Conference on September 14 due to the effects of Hurricane Irma. Their game with UConn, originally scheduled for November 4, was moved to September 24. Their game against Houston was moved from October 28 to November 4.

Source:

Coaching staff

Source:

Game summaries

vs. James Madison

Sources:

at West Virginia

Sources:

vs. Virginia Tech

Sources:

at UConn

Sources:

vs. South Florida

Sources:

vs. Temple

Sources:

at UCF

Sources:

vs. BYU

Sources:

at Houston

Sources:

vs. Tulane

Sources:

vs. Cincinnati

Sources:

at Memphis

Sources:

References

East Carolina
East Carolina Pirates football seasons
East Carolina Pirates football